Marine Attack Squadron 223 (VMA-223) is a United States Marine Corps fixed wing attack squadron that consists of McDonnell-Douglas AV-8B Harrier II (V/STOL)  jets. The squadron is based at Marine Corps Air Station Cherry Point, North Carolina and falls under the command of Marine Aircraft Group 14 (MAG-14) and the 2nd Marine Aircraft Wing (2nd MAW).  The squadron uses "Stone" as its radio callsign.

Mission
Marine Attack Squadron (VMA)-223 is one of four AV-8B Harrier squadrons assigned to Marine Aircraft Group 14, 2nd Marine Aircraft Wing. Its mission is to provide offensive air support, armed reconnaissance, and air-defense for Marine expeditionary forces.

History

World War II

Marine Fighter Squadron 223 (VMF-223) was commissioned on May 1, 1942 at Marine Corps Air Station Ewa, Oahu, Hawaii. The "Bulldogs" first operational aircraft was the Brewster F2A Buffalo.  They left Hawaii for combat equipped with the Grumman F4F Wildcat.  VMA-223 became the first fighter squadron committed to combat during the Battle of Guadalcanal when they landed at Henderson Field on August 20, 1942. Upon arriving, the squadron became part of the Cactus Air Force and for the next two months slugged it out with Japanese pilots, based out of Rabaul, for control of the skies over Guadalcanal.  VMF-223 left the island on October 16, 1942 having accounted for 110½ enemy aircraft shot down including that of Japanese ace Junichi Sasai.  The two leading aces in the squadron  were the commanding officer, Major John L. Smith, with nineteen confirmed shoot downs and Marion E. Carl who was credited with sixteen. Smith was to be awarded the Medal of Honor for heroism and Captain Carl would win the first of his two Navy Crosses for these actions.  These victories would come at the cost of six pilots killed and six wounded, and only eight Wildcats still operational.

 

After being equipped with the new Vought F4U Corsair, the "Bulldogs" continued to fight in such places as the Philippines and Okinawa. Two Presidential Unit Citations were awarded and affixed to the squadron's battle colors during the war. Following transfer from Marine Corps Air Station El Toro to Marine Corps Air Station Cherry Point in 1948, VMA-223 became a carrier squadron. The squadron deployed to the Mediterranean Sea in 1949 aboard .

The "Bulldogs" entered the Jet Age in July 1950, receiving their first jet aircraft, the Grumman F9F Panther.  In August 1957, the squadron was equipped with the North American FJ-4B Fury. A relatively short time later in January 1961, the Fury was replaced by the Douglas A-4 Skyhawk.

Vietnam War

In December 1965, the "Bulldogs" once again were called upon for combat duty in the Far East, this time at Chu Lai, South Vietnam. Supporting allied ground forces, they flew more than 32,000 flight hours. In May 1967, the squadron flew a record 1,234 combat sorties, by far the greatest monthly total for any attack squadron operating in Vietnam. In February 1970, after nearly 5½ years in the Far East, the "Bulldogs" were reassigned to the 3rd Marine Aircraft Wing and returned to MCAS El Toro.

Post Vietnam & 1990s
In May 1975, the squadron received the new A-4M Skyhawk aircraft. During July 1976, VMA-223 transferred from MCAS Yuma to MCAS Iwakuni, Japan.  During August 1977, VMA-223 returned from Japan and joined the 2nd Marine Aircraft Wing, stationed at Cherry Point, North Carolina. During the late 1970s until transition in 1987 VMA-223 flew the A-4M Skyhawk. VMA-223 operated the last production A-4M aircraft painted in a special commemorative paint scheme with the flags of all nations who had operated the A-4 Skyhawk on the sides of the fuselage of the aircraft. In October 1987, VMA-223 transitioned to the McDonnell Douglas AV-8B Harrier II.

VMA-223 Harriers carry the distinctive 'rising sun' rudder pattern as an homage to the squadron's history in World War II.  In 1989 the a portion of the squadron deployed aboard  attached to HMM-264 for a 6-month deployment.  They visited Italy, Spain, Portugal, Monaco, France, Israel and other countries.

March 1990 marked the second Sixth Fleet Deployment for the "Bulldogs" aboard  in support of the 22 MEU. This detachment participated in Operation Sharp Edge, flying armed combat air patrol missions in support of the non-combatant evacuation operations (NEO) over Liberia. In January 1991, the "Bulldogs" deployed a six-plane detachment to Naval Station Rota, Spain for operations in support of Operation Desert Shield and Operation Desert Storm. The Bulldogs briefly occupied the decks of the USS Nassau and the Iwo Jima. The detachment remained at Rota through February, training with Spanish Forces.

Global War on Terror
VMA-223 flew combat missions over Afghanistan in the beginning phases of Operation Enduring Freedom in 2001–2002. In January 2003, the squadron deployed on board  as part of the 2nd Marine Expeditionary Brigade (2nd MEB). During this time, the squadron surpassed 50,000 mishap-free flight hours.

VMA-223 deployed to Iraq late in the summer of 2005 in support of Operation Iraqi Freedom.  During a combat mission over Iraq on February 10, 2006 the squadron surpassed the 60,000 Class A mishap-free hours mark. This milestone is even more impressive considering the maintenance and safety issues associated with the AV-8B aircraft. 
Starting in October 2011, to April 2012 VMA-223 was deployed in support of Operation Enduring Freedom.

Future Plans and current aircraft flown 
As of March 2022,VMA-223 still operates the AV-8B Harrier II.

Squadron aces

In USN and USMC aviation squadrons, a flying ace or fighter ace is a naval aviator or naval flight officer credited with shooting down five or more enemy aircraft during aerial combat.  The following Marines from VMA-223 have been credited with more than five victories:

In the media
Three Harriers from VMA-223 and their pilots were used in the 1994 film True Lies.
Two AV-8B Harriers from VMA-223 were utilized in the flyover of the NASCAR race in Bristol, Tennessee on August 21, 2010.

See also

 United States Marine Corps Aviation
 List of active United States Marine Corps aircraft squadrons
 List of inactive United States Marine Corps aircraft squadrons

Citations

References

Bibliography
 Carl, Marion, USMC. Pushing the Envelope: The Career of Fighter Ace and Test Pilot Marion Carl.. Annapolis, Maryland: Naval Institute Press, 1994. .
 
 Jones, 1stLt. Brett A, USMC. A History of Marine Attack Squadron 223. Washington, D.C.: History and Museums Division, Headquarters, United States Marine Corps, 1978. PCN 19000413900.

External links

Detailed WWII History

223